Burgess Neil Reed (November 29, 1975 – July 26, 2012) was a college basketball player at Indiana University and the University of Southern Mississippi. He was noted for an incident during which he was choked by controversial Indiana coach Bob Knight in 1997.

Biography 
Reed played high school basketball at South Spencer High School in Reo, Indiana, as a freshman, Bloomington High School South in Bloomington, Indiana, as a sophomore, and East Jefferson High School in Jefferson Parish, Louisiana, as a junior and senior. Reed was named the Louisiana High School Boys Basketball Player of the Year in March 1994.

Reed played college basketball with the Indiana Hoosiers for three seasons, and after sitting out a year, one season with the Southern Miss Golden Eagles. Reed appeared in a total of 122 games, scoring 1426 points (11.7 ppg). He led the Big Ten in free throw percentage for the 1996–97 season (.854), and led Conference USA in the same statistic for the 1998–99 season (.845). Indiana appeared in the NCAA tournament during each of Reed's three seasons there, losing in the first round in March 1995, March 1996, and March 1997.

On March 14, 2000, the CNN Sports Illustrated network ran a piece in which former player Reed claimed that he had been choked by Indiana coach Bobby Knight during a 1997 practice. Knight denied the claims in the story. However, less than a month later, the network aired a tape of an Indiana practice from 1997 that appeared to show Knight choking Reed. Knight was later dismissed from Indiana, in September 2000.

Reed's life after basketball included work as an intern at ESPN The Magazine. In 2007, he joined Pioneer Valley High School in Santa Maria, California, as a physical education teacher, later coaching boys basketball, boys and girls golf, and football.

Reed died at the age of 36 following a massive heart attack, at the Marian Regional Medical Center in Santa Maria, California, on July 26, 2012. Reed was married to Kelly with two children, Marley and Presley.

References

Further reading

External links 
 The Last Days of Knight | 30 for 30 Trailer | ESPN via YouTube
 Bob Knight CNN/SI Report via YouTube
 Bob Knight Chokes Neil Reed via YouTube

1976 births
2012 deaths
Basketball players from Arkansas
Basketball players from Louisiana
East Jefferson High School alumni
High school basketball coaches in the United States
Indiana Hoosiers men's basketball players
People from Metairie, Louisiana
Southern Miss Golden Eagles basketball players
Sportspeople from Hot Springs, Arkansas
American men's basketball players
Guards (basketball)